Kikongo is a genus of sub-Saharan African ground spiders first described by B. V. B. Rodrigues and C. A. Rheims in 2020.  it contains only three species: K. buta, K. rutshuru, and K. ruwenzori.

See also
 List of Gnaphosidae species

References

Gnaphosidae genera
Spiders of Africa
Arthropods of the Democratic Republic of the Congo